Aphelenchoides coffeae is a plant pathogenic nematode.

External links 
 Nemaplex, University of California - Aphelenchoides

coffeae
Plant pathogenic nematodes